Thistledown is a 1938 British musical film produced by Irving Asher, directed by Arthur B. Woods and starring Aino Bergo, Keith Falkner, Athole Stewart, Sharon Lynn and Amy Veness. The screenplay concerns the Austrian wife of a Scottish aristocrat.

The British Film Institute has listed the film as lost.

Premise
The Austrian wife of a Scottish aristocrat is driven away by his unfriendly family, but returns years later.

Cast
 Aino Bergo as Therese Glenloch
 Keith Falkner as Sir Ian Glenloch
 Athole Stewart as Duke of Invergower
 Sharon Lynn as Ivy Winter
 Bruce Lester as Lord James Dunfoyle
 Ian Maclean as Rossini
 Amy Veness as Mary Glenloch
 Vera Bogetti as Simmonds
 Gordon McLeod as Gallagher

References

External links

1938 films
1938 musical films
1930s English-language films
Films directed by Arthur B. Woods
Lost British films
British black-and-white films
British musical films
1938 lost films
Lost musical films
1930s British films